The Women's ski cross competition at the FIS Freestyle Ski and Snowboarding World Championships 2021 was held on 13 February 2021. A qualification was held 10 February.

Qualification
The qualification was held on 10 February at 13:15.

Elimination round

Quarterfinals

Heat 1

Heat 3

Heat 2

Heat 4

Semifinals

Heat 1

Heat 2

Finals

Small final

Big final

References

Women's ski cross